Lambrou is a Greek surname that may refer to
Angelos Lambrou (1912–1992), Greek sprint runner
Ioannis Lambrou (born 1921), Greek Olympic high jumper and basketball player
Lambros Lambrou (footballer) (born 1977), Cypriot association football defender
Lambros Lambrou (skier) (born 1957), Cypriot Olympic alpine skier
Maroula Lambrou-Teloni (born 1953), Cypriot Olympic long jumper
Nick Lambrou (born 1983), American music video director and editor